The Landsverk L-180, L-181 and L-182 are a family of armored cars developed by the Swedish company AB Landsverk during the interwar years. They had a good international reputation for being fast, robust and reliable and were acquired in small numbers by Denmark, Estonia, Ireland and the Netherlands, among others.

Design 
The different variants were similarly configured, but were built on different chassis; Büssing-NAG, Mercedes-Benz and Daimler-Benz truck chassis. (See Operators)

Armament 
These vehicles were also similarly armed, most commonly with a Bofors 37 mm or 20 mm Madsen autocannon but was also manufactured with other similar guns. The only exception, Finland, bought one L-182 and armed it with a 13.2 mm L-35/36 machine gun. (See Operators)

Engine 
In the same way, as several different chassis were used, different engines were also used, and where the make of the engine is known, they were manufactured by the same company as the chassis. (See Operators)

Operators

Service 
 
The two L-180 ordered in 1935 and delivered in 1936, were used by the Army Technical Corps of the Danish Army under the designation FP-7 and FP-8.

 
The only L-180 was acquired by Estonia in 1937, were used by the Tallinn Police.

 
The L-182 was bought for testing in 1936, it was used by the armored unit of the Ratsuväkiprikaati and saw limited service in the Winter War. Next, the armored unit of 1. Divisioona
employed it, in the Continuation War in 1941, already with the original 13.2 mm L-35/36 machine gun replaced by the 20 mm L-39 anti-tank rifle, conversion made approximately in December 1940. It seems that the armored car was out of service in late 1941 and was scrapped in 1945.

 
Ireland ordered its first two Landsverk L-180s in 1937 and these were delivered the following year. Six more were then ordered and they were delivered in 1939. A further five were ordered but could not be delivered because of the outbreak of World War II, these five were used instead by the Swedish army. Irish Landsverk L-180s were armed with a Madsen 20mm Cannon and two Madsen .303 Machine Guns. The Madsen machine guns were replaced with .30 Browning machine guns in the 1950s and the 20mm cannon was replaced in the 1970s with Hispano-Suiza 20mm cannons taken from former Irish Air Corps De Havilland Vampire jets. In the 1950s the Landsverks engines were replaced with 5,195cc Ford V8 type 317 petrol developing 155 hp at 3,200rpm. All Irish Landsverks belonged to the 1st Armoured Squadron and used alongside the Irish built Leyland and Dodge Armoured Cars until they re-equipped with Panhard AML armoured cars in 1972. The Landsverks were then transferred to the reserve FCA units, five going to the 11th Motor Squadron and three to the 3rd Motor Squadron until they were all retired in the 1980s.

 
The Lithuanian Army used the six L-181 ordered in 1933 and delivered in 1934.

 
The L-180s from the Danish and Dutch armies were captured and used by the German Army for reconnaissance tasks, patrol and training, being called Panzerspähwagen L 202 (h).
The Dutch L-181s were also captured and put to service by the Ordnungspolizei for security duties.

 
The Dutch Army bought 13 L-180 in 1938, although it could have been delivered 14 L-180, including two as armored command vehicles without main gun (dummy gun instead). From Landsverk AB were also purchased 12 turrets. The command variant used two special turrets. The command vehicles were used on the two armored squadrons, with one vehicle each. The L-180s were designated Pantserwagen M-38.
Netherlands also purchased 12 L-181 and designated them as Pantserwagen M-36.

The Dutch had two squadrons of these Landsverk's operational during the German invasion of the country in May 1940. The 1st squadron [L.181, M.36] with its four platoons of three cars each had been divided over the infantry protection forces of the major air-force bases of Ypenburg, near the Hague, and Schiphol, near Amsterdam. The first six cars at Ypenburg were involved in heavy fighting and contributed considerably to repelling the German airlanding on Ypenburg on 10 May 1940. The 2nd squadron [L-180, M.38] was attached to the Field Army command on the central front of the country. Here they performed a large number of aggressive recce mission during which numerous encounters with German forces of the X.Army Corps occurred. The Dutch operations with the Landsverk's were very successful. Only one was taken out by German countermeasures whereas three were crippled by German bombs or debris on Ypenburg. A number were sabotaged by the Dutch after the capitulation of the Dutch army, but most vehicles were reactivated and serve particularly in the recce battalion of the German 227th Infantry Division in France and later in the former Soviet Union.

 
The five L-180 originally ordered by Ireland and not delivered, were used by the Swedish army under the designation Pansarbil m/41 (Pbil m/41). These vehicles had the Swedish-version of Landsverk Lynx turret with the Bofors 20 mm akan m/40 automatic cannon, instead of the Madsen automatic cannon on Irish vehicles or the more common turret armed with a Bofors 37 mm gun.

 
Probably the armored cars from Estonia and Lithuania were captured during the Soviet occupation of 1940.

Landsverk in Dutch museum 
The Dutch Cavalry Museum in Amersfoort has a Landsverk L-180 in its collection. It is an original Irish version of the vehicle.

See also 
 Landsverk L-185 — A similar armored car from Landsverk.

References 
 Regenberg, Werner. Captured Armored Cars and Vehicles in Wehrmacht Service in World War II. Atglen, PA: Schiffer Publishing, 1996. .

External links 
 Landsverk - Site about AB Landsverk between 1850 and 1992. (Swedish language)
 Tanks! – Site about armored fighting vehicles used by several countries before 1946.
 JAEGER PLATOON:FINNISH ARMY 1918 - 1945 WEBSITE - Site about the Finnish Army.

Notes 

Armoured fighting vehicles of Sweden
Armoured cars of the interwar period
World War II armoured cars
Military vehicles introduced in the 1930s